Lepcha is a Unicode block containing characters for writing the Lepcha language of Sikkim and West Bengal, India.

History
The following Unicode-related documents record the purpose and process of defining specific characters in the Lepcha block:

References 

Unicode blocks